Novhorodka Raion was a raion (district) of Kirovohrad Oblast in central Ukraine. The administrative center of the raion was the urban-type settlement of Novhorodka. The raion was abolished on 18 July 2020 as part of the administrative reform of Ukraine, which reduced the number of raions of Kirovohrad Oblast to four. The area of Novhorodka Raion was merged into Kropyvnytskyi Raion.

At the time of disestablishment, the raion consisted of one hromada, Novhorodka settlement hromada with the administration in Novhorodka.

References

Former raions of Kirovohrad Oblast
1923 establishments in Ukraine
Ukrainian raions abolished during the 2020 administrative reform